Frederikssund Kommune is a municipality on the shores of Roskilde Fjord in the northern part of the island of Zealand (Sjælland) in eastern Denmark.  On 1 January 2007, the municipality was enlarged to include the old Jægerspris, Slangerup, and Skibby municipalities. It now covers an area of 250 km² and has a population of 45,800 (1. January 2022). As of 1 January 2014 its mayor is John Schmidt Andersen, a member of the agrarian liberal Venstre political party. Frederikssund municipality belongs to Region Hovedstaden (Capital Region).

The seat of its municipal council is the town of Frederikssund with a population of 15,283 (1 January 2009). The town is connected to the Hornsherred peninsula by the Kronprins Frederik bridge. The former municipalities of Jægerspris and Skibby are located on this peninsula.

Locations 
The ten largest locations in the municipality are:

Politics

Municipal council
Frederikssund's municipal council consists of 23 members, elected every four years.

Below are the municipal councils elected since the Municipal Reform of 2007.

Recent developments
The new harbour square provides the finishing touches to the harbour developments which began in the 1990s. There are also ambitious plans to build a new residential development to the south of Frederikssund in Vinge north of Store Rørbæk. Vinge Station on the C line of the S-train was opened 14 December 2020.

Twin towns – sister cities

Frederikssund is twinned with:

 Aurskog-Høland, Norway
 Catoira, Spain
 Kowary, Poland
 Kumla, Sweden

 Ramsgate, England, United Kingdom
 Sipoo, Finland
 Somerset, England, United Kingdom

Gallery

See also
 Frederikssund station

References

External links

 Municipal statistics: NetBorger Kommunefakta, delivered from KMD aka Kommunedata (Municipal Data)
 Municipal mergers and neighbors: Eniro new municipalities map
Road map from Google maps
The new Frederikssund municipality's official website (Danish only)
Frederikssund / Hornsherred Tourist Bureau
Frederikssund Gymnasium
Center Bowl
Frederikssund Golf Club
Photos
The local public library (in Danish)
Frederikssund marina (in Danish)

 
Municipalities in the Capital Region of Denmark
Municipalities of Denmark
Populated places established in 2007